Camille Benjamin was the defending champion but lost in the semifinals to Terry Phelps.

Gretchen Magers won in the final 7–6, 6–4 against Phelps.

Seeds
A champion seed is indicated in bold text while text in italics indicates the round in which that seed was eliminated.

  Elly Hakami (quarterfinals)
  Gretchen Magers (champion)
  Wendy White (second round)
  Terry Phelps (final)
  Ann Henricksson (first round)
  Camille Benjamin (semifinals)
  Lisa Bonder (first round)
  Amy Frazier (first round)

Draw

External links
 ITF tournament draws

Women's Singles
Singles